Buddy's Pony Express is a 1935 Warner Bros. Looney Tunes cartoon, directed by Ben Hardaway. The short was released on March 9, 1935, and stars Buddy, the second star of the series.

Summary
The film opens to a lawless town in the Old West; at a saloon, Buddy plays the piano. The bar is tended by a pig, and a dog patron quickly becomes incapacitated by liquor. Cookie the serving girl sings "Oklahoma Joe". In a gunfight, one patron's head is obliterated, only to the revelation that it is a large mask worn by Buddy, who is taking part in the musical number. A lantern then falls on his head.

A dog man enters, and posts, on the wall, an announcement: "Notice! Pony Express Race from Red Gulch to Skull Crick & back -- Mail Contract awarded to winner - Race Starts 2:30 to-day!" All run off to prepare. Buddy, calling the race a cinch, runs off with Cookie to show her his horse, which he claim is "the fastest in the county!" Seeing that the time is nigh, Buddy goes off to ready himself. The cartoon's villain, another dog-like character, takes Buddy's trusty steed to a glue factory, exchanging it for an anemic old horse, which the villain inflates by way of a balloon, and places where Our Hero would expect to find his own animal.

The scene shifts to the site of the race now. Buddy rushes off with the sickly horse to the starting line. The competition begins: a dog with crutches is outraced by a competitor with a dog as his vehicle. But said dog proceeds to chase a rabbit through a series of holes, tangling itself and its master up in the process. Somehow, the villain and Buddy are neck and neck in the race. The dastardly fiend pulls Buddy's horse by its tail and swings the creature around in the air; the villain laughs at the grounded Buddy, but is taken down by a cactus, his horse moving on without him.

The race continues on a road going up a cliff, with Buddy ahead; Buddy is lifted, his straps intact, from the saddle, then caught by a tree and tangled up. With some trouble, he returns to the race, only to encounter a rickety bridge, easily conquered first by the villain, who then shakes it as Buddy rides upon it. The bridge rolls up into a wheel with Buddy, sitting a-gee, inside. The wheel crashes into a rock by the precipice of a cliff and breaks; the horse is down, and Buddy, flung over the edge, hangs on a small tree branch on the cliffside. The villain laughs, and, in an effort to send Buddy to his watery doom, tosses a large rock at the branch, which bounces the boulder back up, hitting the scoundrel in the face; the villain falls from the perch of the cliff, taking the grass and the horses with him. The flimsy branch breaks under all of the new weight, and so Our Hero, his adversary, and the horses fall into the water.

Buddy now sits, above the water, on an upside-down horse, the villain on a right-side-up horse, but underwater. As the two struggle to reach land, the villain cuts the previously hidden balloon tail hanging from Buddy's horse's mouth, allowing the horse to deflate. The villain moves on, back to the racetrack, whilst Buddy is left to push his horse out of the lake. The tired creature can not seem to be motivated, until, as part of an oncoming rain shower, a bolt of lightning suddenly strikes the horse's behind! And lightning continues to strike Our Hero's steed as they near the finish line. Buddy and his enemy are again neck and neck, and just before the end of the race can be reached by either, both fall into mud puddles. With Cookie cheering him on, Buddy wins the race, for another bolt of lightning sends his horse galloping, underground, to the other side of the finish line. Buddy is awarded the mail contract, and Buddy and Cookie give the much-abused horse a kiss.

Dating discrepancy
This article's dating follows the information given in Looney Tunes and Merrie Melodies filmography (1929-1939), which, in this case, agrees on the release date, though not the release order, of the cartoon in question, with the appendix of Leonard Maltin's Of Mice and Magic. After Buddy's Pony Express, and Maltin's book agree on the release order, though not necessarily the release dates, of Buddy's cartoons. For more on this issue, see the relevant section of the article on Buddy's Circus.

References

External links
 
 

1935 films
1935 animated films
1930s American animated films
1930s animated short films
1930s sports films
1935 Western (genre) films
American black-and-white films
Films scored by Bernard B. Brown
Films scored by Norman Spencer (composer)
Films directed by Ben Hardaway
Buddy (Looney Tunes) films
American horse racing films
Looney Tunes shorts
1930s English-language films